Orso II Participazio (died 932) was the eighteenth doge of the Republic of Venice, by tradition (historically, he was the sixteenth), from 912 to 932.

History
In 912 he was kidnapped in the Adriatic by a Serb prince of Zachlumia by the name of Mihailo Višević while returning with the Doge's son from an official visit to Constantinople. Bulgaria was at war with Byzantium, the sovereign of Venice, so the coastal prince, who was a Bulgarian ally, dispatched him to Emperor Simeon I of Bulgaria, hoping he would push off Petar Gojniković's domination in the area.

He was elected by the popular assembly. It seems that he was not related to the Participazio family that had already given many doges to the city. (There was a prior Orso II Participazio who vied for dogeship in about 887 but appears to have been entirely unrelated.) As soon as elected, he sent his son Pietro to Constantinople in order to re-establish the relationships with the Byzantine emperor, which his predecessors had neglected. Pietro was named protospatharios, which was corrupted to Baduario and, eventually, to Badoer (pronounced “Badoèr”), which became a prominent name among successive generations of Venetian nobility. The Adriatic was still plagued by Dalmatian, Saracen, and Narentine pirates, but the Doge took no action. Under his leadership, Venice acquired a mint. In 932, he withdrew to the monastery of Saint Felice in Ammiana, where he led a monastic life until his death. He was buried there. His portrait is placed in the church of the Madonna of the Garden.

Sources
 

932 deaths
10th-century Doges of Venice
Orso
Year of birth unknown
Protospatharioi
Byzantine Empire–Republic of Venice relations